Fifth Harmony is an American four-piece girl group consisting of members Ally Brooke, Normani Kordei, Dinah Jane and Lauren Jauregui. Former member Camila Cabello was part of the group until December 2016.

The group signed a joint recording contract with Simon Cowell's label Syco Records and Epic Records after finishing third in the second season of the American televised singing competition, The X Factor in 2012. After recording a series of covers posted on the video sharing platform, YouTube, the group announced their first extended play, Better Together, spawning the MTV Video Music Award for Artist to Watch winning song, "Miss Movin' On", becoming the first all-female group to win an award in this network since The Pussycat Dolls in 2008.

Reflection, the group's debut studio album, was released in 2015. It spawned three singles—"Boss", "Sledgehammer" and "Worth It", all of which were successful. The third single "Worth It" won their nomination for Song of Summer at the 2015 MTV Video Music Awards. The group's second studio album, 7/27 was released in 2016. The lead single, "Work from Home" became the group's first top 5 hit on the Billboard Hot 100. The song helped Fifth Harmony earn many awards, among them the collaboration category for the American Music Awards. Two of the album's singles, the lead and "All in My Head (Flex)" received an MTV Video Music Award in separate categories.

The group has been included on Billboards annual "21 under 21 list" since 2013, climbing gradually and eventually topping it in 2016.

American Music Awards
The American Music Awards (AMAs) is an annual music awards show created by Dick Clark in 1973.

!
|-
!scope="row"| 2016
| "Work from Home" (featuring Ty Dolla Sign)
| Collaboration of the Year 
| 
| style="text-align:center;"|
|}

Billboard Women in Music 
Established in 2007, Billboard Woman of the Year is presented annually at Billboard Women in Music, and honors female contributions to the business, and leadership in embracing the changing music. Other awards to female artists are presented during the ceremony.

!
|-
!scope="row"| 2015
| Fifth Harmony
| Group of the Year 
| 
| style="text-align:center;"|
|}

Bravo Otto Awards 
Bravo Otto award is a German accolade honoring excellence of performers in film, television and music. Presented annually since 1957, winners are selected by the readers of Bravo magazine. The award is presented in gold, silver and bronze. Fifth Harmony has won two silver awards from two nominations.

!
|-
!scope="row"| 2015
| rowspan="2" |Fifth Harmony
| Super-Band 
| 
| style="text-align:center;"|
|-
!scope="row"| 2016
| Super-Band
| 
| style="text-align:center;"|
|}

British LGBT Awards
The British LGBT Awards celebrate the United Kingdom’s most loved LGBT personalities, innovators and companies – dubbed the “Gay Oscars” by the press. Last year, the Awards were the country’s most publicised LGBT event.

!
|-
!scope="row"| 2017
| Fifth Harmony
| Music Artist of the Year 
| 
| style="text-align:center;"|
|}

Glamour Awards
The Glamour Awards is hosted by Glamour magazine every year to hand out different awards to honor women from a variety of fields, including entertainment, business, sports, music, science, medicine, education, and politics.

!
|-
!scope="row" | 2016
| Fifth Harmony
| Band of the Year 
| 
| style="text-align:center;"|
|-
!scope="row" | 2017
|Fifth Harmony
|Best International Act
|
| style="text-align:center;"|
|}

Guinness World Records

iHeartRadio Music Awards 
The iHeartRadio Music Awards is a music awards show, founded by iHeartRadio in 2014, to recognize the most popular artists and music over the past year as determined by the network's listeners.

!
|-
!scope="row" rowspan="2" |2016
| "Uptown Funk" (featuring Jasmine V, Jacob Whitesides, and Mahogany Lox)
| Best Cover Song
| 
| rowspan="2" style="text-align:center;"|
|-
| Harmonizers (Fifth Harmony)
| Best Fan Army
| 
|-
!scope="row" rowspan="3"| 2017
| Harmonizers (Fifth Harmony)
| Best Fan Army
| 
| rowspan="3" style="text-align:center;"|
|-
| "Work from Home" (featuring Ty Dolla Sign)
| Best Music Video
| 
|-
| "Ex's & Oh's"
| Best Cover Song
| 
|-
!scope="row"| 2018
| Harmonizers (Fifth Harmony)
| Best Fan Army
| 
| style="text-align:center;"|
|}

Japan Gold Disc Award
The Japan Gold Disc Award is a major music awards show that is held annually in Japan, honoring music sales according to be Recording Industry Association of Japan. Fifth Harmony has won three awards.

!
|-
!scope="row" rowspan="3"| 2017
| rowspan="2" | Fifth Harmony
| New Artist of the Year (International)
| 
| style="text-align:center;" rowspan="3"|
|-
| Best 3 New Artists
| 
|-
| "Work from Home" (featuring Ty Dolla Sign)
|Song of the Year by Download (International)
| 
|}

Melon Music Awards
The Melon Music Awards is a major music awards show that is held annually in South Korea. It is known for only calculating digital sales and online votes to judge winners. Fifth Harmony has been nominated once.

!
|-
!scope="row"| 2015
| "Worth It" (featuring Kid Ink)
| Best Pop Song
| 
| style="text-align:center;"|
|}

MTV Awards

MTV Europe Music Awards
The MTV Europe Music Awards (commonly abbreviated as the EMAs) is an awards show presented by MTV. The award show was established in 1994 by MTV Europe to award the best music videos from European and international artists. Fifth Harmony has won four awards from six nominations.

!
|-
!scope="row" rowspan="4"| 2014
| rowspan="6"| Fifth Harmony
| Best US Act
| 
| rowspan="4" style="text-align:center;"|
|-
| Best North America Act
| 
|-
| Best Worldwide Act
| 
|-
| Artist on the Rise
| 
|-
!scope="row" |2016
| Best Pop
| 
| style="text-align:center;"|
|-
!scope="row" |2017
| Best US Act
| 
| style="text-align:center;"|
|}

MTV Fandom Awards
The MTV Fandom Awards is an awards show presented by mtvU to honor the best fan followings on social media sites. Fifth Harmony have won one award from one nomination.

!
|-
!scope="row"| 2015
| Harmonizers
| Fandom Army of the Year
| 
| style="text-align:center;"|
|}

MTV Video Music Awards
The Video Music Awards (commonly abbreviated as the VMAs) is an awards show presented by MTV to honor the best in music videos. Fifth Harmony has won four awards to date.

!
|-
!scope="row"| 2014
| "Miss Movin' On"
| Artist to Watch
| 
| style="text-align:center;"|
|-
!scope="row"| 2015
| "Worth It" (featuring Kid Ink)
| Song of Summer
| 
| style="text-align:center;"|
|-
!scope="row" rowspan="2"| 2016
| "Work from Home" (featuring Ty Dolla Sign)
| Best Collaboration
| 
| rowspan="2" style="text-align:center;"|
|-
| "All in My Head (Flex)" (featuring Fetty Wap)
| Song of Summer
| 
|-
!scope="row" rowspan="3"| 2017
|rowspan="3"|"Down" (featuring Gucci Mane)
|Best Pop Video
|
| rowspan="3" style="text-align:center;"|
|-
|Best Choreography
|
|-
|Song of Summer
|
|-
|}

MTV Italian Music Awards
The MTV Music Awards Italy are an annual award ceremony hosted by MTV Italy. The ceremony awards the best video, performers, and artists of the year. Fifth Harmony has won one awards from three nominations.

!
|-
!scope="row"| 2015
| Fifth Harmony
| Best Artist from the World
| 
| style="text-align:center;"|
|-
!scope="row"| 2016
| Harmonizers
| Best Fan
| 
| style="text-align:center;"|
|-
!scope="row"| 2017
| Fifth Harmony
| Artist Saga
| 
| style="text-align:center;"|
|}

MTV Video Music Awards Japan
The MTV Video Music Awards Japan are the Japanese version of the MTV Video Music Awards. Fifth Harmony has won one award from three nominations.

!
|-
!scope="row" rowspan="3" | 2016
| rowspan="3"| "Work from Home" (featuring Ty Dolla Sign)
| Best International Group Video
| 
| rowspan="3" style="text-align:center;"|
|-
| Best Pop Video
| 
|-
| Best Choreography
| 
|}

Much Music Video Awards
The Much Music Video Awards (also known as MMVAs) are annual awards presented by the Canadian TV channel Much to honor the year's best music videos. Fifth Harmony has won two awards from three nominations.

!
|-
!scope="row" rowspan="3"| 2016
| rowspan="3"| Fifth Harmony
| Fan Fave International Artist or Group
| 
| rowspan="3" style="text-align:center;"|
|-
|iHeartRadio International Duo or Group
| 
|-
|Most Buzzworthy International Artist or Group
| 
|}

Music Choice 100
Music Choice Play is a music video, lifestyle and entertainment network for Millennials. The network has a series of on-air awards near the end of every year.

!
|-
!scope="row" | 2014
| Fifth Harmony
| Favorite Fandom
| 
| style="text-align:center;"|
|}

Myx Music Awards
The Myx Music Awards is an annual awards show in the Philippines that honors the year's both Filipino and international music.

!
|-
!scope="row" | 2017
| Fifth Harmony
| Favorite International Video
| 
| style="text-align:center;"|
|}

Nickelodeon Awards

Nickelodeon Kids' Choice Awards
The Nickelodeon Kids' Choice Awards is an annual awards show that honors the year's biggest television, movie, and music acts as voted by Nickelodeon viewers. Fifth Harmony has won five awards from five nominations.

!
|-
!scope="row" | 2015
| rowspan="3"| Fifth Harmony
| Favorite New Artist
| 
| style="text-align:center;"|
|-
!scope="row" | 2016
| Favorite Music Group
| 
| style="text-align:center;"|
|-
!scope="row" rowspan="2"| 2017
| Favorite Music Group
| 
| rowspan="2" style="text-align:center;"|
|-
| "Work from Home" (featuring Ty Dolla Sign)
| Favorite Song
| 
|-
!scope="row" | 2018
| rowspan="3"| Fifth Harmony
| Favorite Music Group
| 
|
|-
|}

Meus Prêmios Nick
The Meus Prêmios Nick is an annual awards show that awards entertainers with a blimp trophy, as voted by kids on internet. The show is usually held on October and televised days later.

!
|-
!scope="row" | 2016
| Fifth Harmony
| Favorite International Artist
| 
| style="text-align:center;"|
|-
!scope="row" | 2017
| "Down" (feat. Gucci Mane)
| Favorite International Music Video
| 
| 
|}

NRJ Music Awards
The NRJ Music Awards, created in 2000 by the radio station NRJ in partnership with the television network TF1 takes place every year in mid-January at Cannes (PACA, France) as the opening of MIDEM (Marché international de l'édition musicale). They give out awards to popular musicians by different categories.

!
|-
!scope="row" | 2016
| Fifth Harmony
| International Breakthrough of the Year
| 
| style="text-align:center;"|
|}

People's Choice Awards
The People's Choice Awards is an American awards show, recognizing the people and the work of popular culture, voted on by the general public. Fifth Harmony has won twice.

!
|-
!scope="row" | 2015
| rowspan="3"| Fifth Harmony
| Favorite Breakout Artist
| 
| style="text-align:center;"|
|-
!scope="row" | 2016
| Favorite Group
| 
| style="text-align:center;"|
|-
!scope="row" | 2017
| Favorite Group
| 
| style="text-align:center;"|
|}

Premios Juventud
Premios Juventud is an awards show for Spanish-speaking celebrities in the areas of film, music, sports, fashion, and pop culture, presented by the television network Univision. Fifth Harmony have won two awards from four nominations.

!
|-
!scope="row" rowspan="2"| 2015
| Fifth Harmony
| Best Dressed
| 
| rowspan="2" style="text-align:center;"|
|-
| "Worth It" (featuring Kid Ink)
| Best Performance
| 
|-
!scope="row" rowspan="2"| 2016
| Fifth Harmony
| Favorite Tweeter
| 
| rowspan="2" style="text-align:center;"|
|-
| "Work from Home" (featuring Ty Dolla Sign)
| Favorite Hit
| 
|-
|}

Premios Telehit
Premios Telehit is an annual award show run by the Mexican music channel Telehit. The ceremony awards artists of the year. Fifth Harmony has won one award from two nominations.

!
|-
!scope="row" | 2015
| rowspan="2"| Fifth Harmony
| Most Popular Artist of the Year
| 
| style="text-align:center;"|
|-
!scope="row" | 2016
| Best Public Artist
| 
| style="text-align:center;"|
|}

Premios Tu Mundo
Premios Tu Mundo (Spanish for "Your World Awards"), is an awards show presented by American television network Telemundo. The awards celebrates the achievements of Hispanics and Latinos in the media including TV shows, movies, music, fashion, and sports.

!
|-
!scope="row" | 2015
| Harmonizers
| Fan Club of the Year
| 
| style="text-align:center;"|
|}

Radio Disney Music Awards
The Radio Disney Music Awards (sometimes seen as the RDMAs) is an annual awards show which is operated and governed by Radio Disney, an American radio network. Fifth Harmony have won eight awards from nine nominations.

!
|-
!scope="row" rowspan="2" | 2014
| Fifth Harmony
| Breakout Artist of the Year
| 
| rowspan="2" style="text-align:center;"|
|-
| "Me & My Girls"
| Best Song to Rock Out to With Your BFF
| 
|-
!scope="row" rowspan="3" | 2015
| Fifth Harmony
| Best Music Group
| 
| rowspan="3" style="text-align:center;"|
|-
| "Boss"
| Catchiest New Song
| 
|-
| Harmonizers
| Fiercest Fans
| 
|-
!scope="row" rowspan="2" | 2016
| Fifth Harmony
| Best Music Group
| 
| rowspan="2" style="text-align:center;"|
|-
| Harmonizers 
| Fiercest Fans
| 
|-
!scope="row" rowspan="2" | 2017
| Fifth Harmony
| Best Group
| 
| rowspan="2" style="text-align:center;"|
|-
| Harmonizers 
| Fiercest Fans
| 
|}

Shorty Awards
The Shorty Awards honor the best of social media through tweet-nominations. People and organizations are recognized for producing real-time short form content across social media sites. Fifth Harmony has won one award from two nominations.

!
|-
!scope="row" | 2014
| rowspan="2"| Fifth Harmony
| Best Band
| 
| style="text-align:center;"|
|-
!scope="row" | 2015
| Best Band
|
| style="text-align:center;"|
|}

Streamy Awards
The Streamy Awards are presented annually by Dick Clark Productions and Tubefilter to recognize and honor excellence in online video, including directing, acting, producing, and writing. The formal ceremony at which the awards are presented takes place in Los Angeles, California.

!
|-
!scope="row" | 2015
| "Uptown Funk" (featuring Jasmine V, Jacob Whitesides, and Mahogany Lox)
| Cover Song
| 
| style="text-align:center;"|
|}

Teen Choice Awards
The Teen Choice Awards were established in 1999 to honor the year's biggest achievements in music, movies, sports and television, being voted by young people aged between 13 and 19. Fifth Harmony have won ten awards from twenty-seven nominations.

!
|-
!scope="row" rowspan="6"| 2014
| rowspan="3" | Fifth Harmony
| Choice Music Group
| 
| rowspan="6" style="text-align:center;"|
|-
| Choice Breakout Group
| 
|-
| Choice Summer Group
| 
|-
| "Miss Movin' On"
| Choice Break-Up Song
| 
|-
| Harmonizers
| Choice Fanatic Fans
| 
|-
|"Boss"
| Choice Single: Group
| 
|-
!scope="row" rowspan="7"| 2015
|rowspan="2"|"Worth It" (featuring Kid Ink)
| Choice Song: Group 
| 
| rowspan="7" style="text-align:center;"|
|-
| Choice Summer Song 
| 
|-
| "Sledgehammer" 
| Choice Love Song
| 
|-
|rowspan="3"| Fifth Harmony
| Choice Music Group: Female
| 
|-
| Choice Female Hottie 
| 
|-
| Choice Summer Music Star: Group
| 
|-
| Harmonizers
| Choice Fandom
| 
|-
!scope="row" rowspan="8"| 2016
|rowspan="3"| Fifth Harmony
| Choice Music Group
| 
| rowspan="8" style="text-align:center;"|
|-  
| Choice Summer Music Star: Group
| 
|-
| Choice Social Media Queen
| 
|-
| The 7/27 Tour
| Choice Summer Tour
|  
|-
| Harmonizers
| Choice Fandom
| 
|-
|rowspan="2"|"Work from Home" (featuring Ty Dolla Sign)
| Choice Song: Group
| 
|-
| Choice Summer Song
| 
|-
| "I'm In Love With A Monster"
| Choice Song from a Movie or TV Show
| 
|-
!scope="row" rowspan="4"| 2017
| Fifth Harmony
| Choice Music Group
| 
| rowspan="4" style="text-align:center;"|
|-
| "Down" (featuring Gucci Mane)
| Choice Song: Group
| 
|-
| Fifth Harmony
| Choice Summer Group
| 
|-
| Harmonizers
| Choice Fandom
| 
|-
!scope="row" rowspan="2"| 2018
| Fifth Harmony
| Choice Music Group
|
| rowspan="2" style="text-align:center;"|
|-
| Harmonizers
| Choice Fandom
|
|-
|}

YouTube Music Awards
The YouTube Music Awards, abbreviated as the YTMAs, is the inaugural music award show presented by YouTube. Fifth Harmony has won one award from two nominations.

!
|-
!scope="row" | 2013
| "Mirrors" (with Boyce Avenue)
| Response of the Year
| 
| style="text-align:center;"|
|-
!scope="row" | 2015
| Fifth Harmony
| 50 Artists to Watch
| 
| style="text-align:center;"|
|}

Notes

References

External links

Awards
Lists of awards received by American musician
Lists of awards received by musical group